Arthur Collins (7 September 1871 – 22 July 1945) was an English cricketer who played first-class cricket for Sussex between 1895 and 1902. He appeared in 53 first-class matches as a right-handed batsman who bowled left-arm orthodox spin.

An opening batsman, Collins made his only first-class century against Gloucestershire in June 1900, when he scored 22 and 102. Later that month, on a difficult pitch at Eastbourne, he batted for 195 minutes while top-scoring with 29 in a team total of 108 against Essex. He missed the 1901 season after contracting typhoid fever. In Sussex's two matches against Gloucestershire in 1896 he dismissed W. G. Grace twice with his spin bowling, though Grace scored a total of 547 runs in the two matches.

References

1871 births
1945 deaths
People from East Grinstead
English cricketers
Sussex cricketers